Sunshine Ahead is a 1936 British musical comedy film directed by Wallace Orton and starring Eddie Pola, Betty Astell and Leslie Perrins. It was made at Cricklewood Studios as a quota quickie for release by Universal Pictures.

Cast
 Eddie Pola as The Producer  
 Betty Astell as The Girl  
 Leslie Perrins as The Critic  
 Eve Lister as The Secretary 
 Doris Arnold as herself  
 George Baker as himself  
 Webster Booth as himself  
 Dan Carlos as himself  
 Leonard Henry  as himself  
 Leslie Holmes as himself  
 Ruth Naylor as herself  
 Jack Payne as himself  
 Harry S. Pepper as himself  
 Harold Ramsay as himself  
 Rios and Santos as Themselves
 Leslie Sarony as himself  
 Pasqual Troise as himself 
 The Sherman Fisher Girls as Dancers

References

Bibliography
 Low, Rachael. Filmmaking in 1930s Britain. George Allen & Unwin, 1985.
 Wood, Linda. British Films, 1927-1939. British Film Institute, 1986.

External links

1936 films
British musical comedy films
1936 musical comedy films
Films shot at Cricklewood Studios
Quota quickies
British black-and-white films
1930s English-language films
1930s British films